Jysk A/S is a Danish retail chain, selling household goods such as mattresses, furniture, and interior décor. Jysk is the largest Danish retailer operating internationally with over 3,100 stores in 51 countries. Jysk (meaning "Jutlandic") was founded by Lars Larsen, who opened the first store on Silkeborgvej in the Danish city of Aarhus in April 1979. It is owned by the founder Lars Larsen's family through the holding company Lars Larsen Group which also owns wholly or partly the furniture chains ILVA , IDÉmøbler, IDdesign, Bolia.com, and Sengespecialisten. The logo displays a goose, which has a historical thread to the brand. Due to the Scandinavian design for its products, it is also called the Danish IKEA in a small format.



History

1979-1989
On 2 April 1979, the world's first Jysk Sengetøjslager opened in Aarhus, Denmark, where it still operates today.

In 1984, Jysk Sengetøjslager opened its first store outside the country - Dänisches Bettenlager in Germany; and the Jysk franchise also opened its first store in Greenland. In 1986, Jysk opened its first store in the Faroe Islands.  In 1987, Jysk expanded to Iceland as "Rúmfatalagerinn" and opened a store in Kópavogur. In 1988, Jysk expanded to Norway as "Norsk Sengetøylager" and opened its first store in Stavanger.

1990-1999
In 1995, Jysk opened its first store in Finland.
In 1996: Jysk opened its first Canadian store in Coquitlam, British Columbia
In 1998, The company celebrated the opening its store number 500.

2000-2009
In 2000, Jysk opened its first store in Poland.
In 2001, The stores in Denmark, Sweden, Norway and Finland changed their name from Jysk Sengetøjslager, Jysk Bäddlager, Norsk Sengetøylager and Jysk Vuodevarasto to Jysk. In 2004, Jysk opened its first store in Hungary. In 2008, Jysk Nordic opened Northern Europe's largest warehouse in Uldum in Mid-Jutland. The warehouse now has an area of 64,000 m2. In 2008, Jysk opened its first stores in the United Kingdom. Mansfield and Lincoln opened in April, then Blackburn and York opened in the summer.

2010-2019
In 2010, Jysk was granted a royal warrant of appointment as a purveyor to the Queen of Denmark.
Also in 2010, Jysk's staff magazine GO JYSK won several awards, as staff magazine 2010 in Denmark and as the second best staff magazine in Europe. In 2011, Jysk launched its own television channel on www.jysk.tv. In 2013, Jysk opened its first store in Yerevan, the capital city of Armenia. This marked the first Jysk store in the Caucasus. In 2014–2015, Jysk opened a store in Mall Taman Anggrek and Pejaten Village in Jakarta, Indonesia. Jysk continued to expand in Indonesia as the company opens four new stores at Margo City Depok, Kuningan City and Pluit Village in Jakarta, and Aeon Mall BSD City in Tangerang. In 2016, Jysk expanded by opening its first stores in Singapore at Tiong Bahru Plaza.
two stores in Belarus, its first store in Tajikistan,
and its first store in Tbilisi. In 2017, it expanded further opening its third store in Minsk, and the first in Brest. and its first store in Kuwait. In 2018, Jysk opened its first store in Dubai. In 2019, Jysk opened its first store in Thailand. and opened its first store in Baku. and opened its 4th logistics hub in Bulgaria - DCB (Distribution Center Bozhurishte), and Jysk opened its first store in the Republic of Ireland. Located in Naas it was the first of a planned 15 stores across the country. This was later upped to a planned 40 stores. Stores currently operate in Naas, Drogheda, Navan, Portlaoise,  Thurles, Youghal, Little Island, Limerick, Sligo, and Santry (as of February 2022).

Lars Larsen died 19 August 2019.

2020-present 
In 2020, Jysk opened its first store in Moscow. The Austrian branch, formerly "Dänisches Bettenlager", was rebranded to "Jysk" in 2020 The German branch, formerly "Dänisches Bettenlager", rebranded to "Jysk" in 2021.

Following the 2022 Russian invasion of Ukraine, which led to the temporary closure of the 13 stores in Russia, JYSK has announced on 30 March that it will close their stores permanently and leave Russia completely.

Stores

Jysk-stores are operating through the three entities Jysk Nordic, Dänisches Bettenlager, and Jysk-Franchise. Jysk Nordic operates over 1,500 stores in 20 countries (including Scandinavia and Central and Eastern Europe). Dänisches Bettenlager operates over 1300 stores in Germany, Austria, Switzerland, Italy, France, Spain, and Portugal. The "Dänisches Bettenlager"-name was used for stores until 2020 in Austria and until 2021 in Germany, which is the largest market for Jysk, while the stores in Switzerland, Italy, France, Spain, and Portugal are operated under the name Jysk.

Jysk also includes franchises agreements around the world with over 200 stores in 25 countries (including Canada, Baltics, United Arab Emirates, Kuwait, Tajikistan, Thailand and Vietnam).

Geographic distribution
Number of the store by country as of 31 August 2021.

References

External links

Official website

Furniture retailers
Retail companies of Denmark
Design companies of Denmark
Purveyors to the Court of Denmark
Companies based in Aarhus
Retail companies established in 1979
Multinational companies headquartered in Denmark
Danish brands
Danish companies established in 1979
Design companies established in 1979